Yves Laszlo is a French mathematician working in the University of Paris-Sud.  He specializes in algebraic geometry.

Laszlo obtained his Ph.D. in 1988 from the University of Paris-Sud under the supervision of Arnaud Beauville.
He started the Fondation Mathématique Jacques Hadamard in 2011, and directed it until 2012.

The Beauville–Laszlo theorem on gluing sheaves together is named after Laszlo and Beauville, who published it in 1995.

References

External links 
 Laszlo's Web page

Year of birth missing (living people)
Living people
20th-century French mathematicians
21st-century French mathematicians